The Sneath Glass Company  was an American manufacturer of glass and glassware. After a brief 1890s startup in Tiffin, Ohio, the Company moved to Hartford City, Indiana, to take advantage of the Indiana Gas Boom. The small city was enjoying the benefits of the boom, and could provide natural gas as an energy source for manufacturers. Sneath Glass was one of many glass manufacturers that moved to the region, and became Hartford City's second largest employer.

Among the original owners, Ohio businessman Ralph Davis Sneath provided capital and financial knowledge—and his family is the company's namesake. Sneath was president of the firm when it moved to Indiana. Henry Crimmel, who already had over 25 years of glassmaking experience when he joined the company, provided the manufacturing expertise after the firm's reorganization. Following this reorganization, Alva Clyde Crimmel (Henry's son) was the firm's secretary, while John W. Geiger served as treasurer. These four members of the management team were the company's owners when it moved to Indiana.

In Indiana, the company's main products were initially lantern globes and founts (which held the lantern's fuel), and railroads were its major customers. As demand for lanterns declined during the beginning of the 20th century, Sneath evolved to be a maker of glassware for portable kitchen cabinets, such as those made by Sellers and the Hoosier Manufacturing Company. Eventually, portable kitchen cabinets lost their popularity after new houses began utilizing built-in cabinetry. Sneath transitioned to be a maker of a new group of wares—glass products for refrigerators. While lanterns, kitchenware, and refrigerator products were the major goods manufactured by the company during its existence, it also made a wide variety of additional merchandise. Aquariums, lenses, and mailboxes were also among the glass products made by the company. Sneath was also an early manufacturer of heat-proof glass.

After World War II, Sneath's major products began to become obsolete because of the plastics industry.  Unlike earlier in the century, the company did not transition to a new major product when demand for its portfolio of manufactured goods subsided.  Management did not adapt to competition from the plastics industry, faced a shrinking market for its goods, and could not raise prices due to post-war government price controls.  The factory closed in 1952 after a work stoppage led by the local labor unions.

Early years
The Tiffin Glass Company was established in 1889 in Tiffin, Ohio.  On January 22, 1892, the company was purchased by Samuel B. Sneath, Ralph D. Sneath, and John. W. Geiger—and renamed Sneath Glass Company.  Production began in February, and their main products were lantern globes and tumblers.  After a reorganization and the destruction of its Tiffin works by fire, the company was lured to Hartford City, Indiana.  Located in East Central Indiana, Hartford City offered free natural gas and land. The East Central Indiana area was enjoying an economic “boom” period at that time caused by the discovery of natural gas.  The first Sneath Glass plant in Hartford City was located on the north side of town.  Production began in September 1894, and the company already had orders for 6 months of work on the first day of operation.

Following the company's reorganization, the firm's officers were Ralph Davis Sneath, president; John. W. Geiger, treasurer; Alvie Clyde Crimmel, secretary; and Henry Crimmel, plant manager. These four men were also the owners of the company, each owning equal shares of its stock.  The board of directors consisted of the four owners plus Ralph's father, Samuel B. Sneath.  The Sneaths came from a family of prominent businessmen from Tiffin, Ohio, and the Crimmels came from a family of glassmakers. Ralph Sneath also became involved in a grain dealership, railroading, and banking.  He eventually became president of the Commercial National Bank of Tiffin, Ohio, and also president of the Ohio Banker's Association.
Civil War veteran Henry Crimmel brought over 25 years of glass making experience to the company, having learned and sharpened his skills in Bellaire, Fostoria, and Tiffin, Ohio.  Henry's brothers, Johannes (a.k.a. John) and Jacob, worked in glassmaking—and Jacob also helped found the American Flint Glass Workers' Union.  Both Henry and Jacob Crimmel were considered key craftsmen in the early days of the Fostoria Glass Company.  While the Sneaths remained in Tiffin to oversee their many business interests, the Crimmels and Tiffin businessman J. W. Geiger moved to Hartford City.

Originally, Sneath Glass made kerosene lantern globes and the founts that held the lantern's fuel.  Ruby, green, and blue globes were a specialty.  At one time, Sneath Glass was one of only three factories in the United States that made copper ruby globes.  Major customers of lantern globes were railroads and ships.  Sneath globes were also used during the construction of the Panama Canal.

By 1897, the company had over 60 employees.  Although plant manager Henry Crimmel was known for his craftsmanship, he was also mechanically inclined.  The Sneath plant had a unique system of air hoses that would allow glass blowers to quickly finish glassware that was started without the aid of machinery, enabling the skilled workers to achieve a much higher production rate.  Henry Crimmel received a patent in 1904 for a “Glass Drawing Machine” that was an improvement for glass blowing and prevented irregularities in the glass.

In 1905, Sneath Glass moved to the Jones plant of the American Window Glass Company, located on Wabash Avenue in the west side of Hartford City.  The Wabash Avenue site had direct access to a railroad, and was close to Washington Street, which eventually became part of Indiana State Road 26, now the major east-west highway through the city.  The Jones plant was quickly remodeled, and both operations and headquarters were moved to that site.  This location became the permanent home of Sneath Glass Company.

John W. Geiger, part of the original company ownership and management, retired in 1907 and moved back to Tiffin, Ohio.  He died at his home in Tiffin on June 23, 1915, at the age of 74 years.  Another original investor, Samuel B. Sneath, died earlier in the same (1915) year, on January 7.

Transition from globes to other products

Originally, the company devoted its production exclusively to lighting and lantern-related products such as lantern globes and founts.  It made more globes than any two companies combined.  Several factors contributed to the need for a transition from globe manufacturer, and all were related to declining demand. First, around the beginning of the 20th century, electrification and the incandescent light bulb began replacing oil lamps, causing less need for lamp globes and fonts in cities.  A few decades later, railroads (major customers for globes) stopped expanding.  Railroad route miles peaked around 1916, and railroad employees peaked around 1920. Since the railroad industry was shrinking, its demand for lantern globes would diminish.  Finally, in the 1930s, rural electrification decreased farmers' need for oil lamps.

By 1899, the company was listed as the only manufacturer of semaphore globes and bulls eye lenses. However, the company was diversifying from its lighting products portfolio with fruit jars and glassware.    Three sizes of Mason jars were being hand blown by 1908.  The Sneath jars were said to be "superior and more durable than machine made jars."  Around the same time, the company began making glass canisters for kitchen cabinet companies, including the Hoosier cabinet made by Hoosier Manufacturing Company. This began the gradual (but important) transition from manufacturer of globes to manufacturer of glass products for portable kitchen cabinets. Cabinet products included salt and sugar bins, spice jars, and coffee and tea jars. From 1914 to 1916, management patented dispensing caps, a dispensing jar, and a bracket for supporting dispensing bins used in kitchen cabinets.

Henry Crimmel suffered a stroke in 1916, and died about one year later. Henry's son (and company co-founder) Alva Clyde (a.k.a. Alvie or Clyde) Crimmel took more management responsibilities at that time, and by 1920 his title was Vice-President and Treasurer. Clyde's oldest son, Henry Hays Crimmel, joined the company's management in 1918, focusing on sales. Henry Hays had been working at Sneath since he was a child, and was very familiar with the company's products. Child labor was common in glass factories during the 19th century and early 20th century. The elder Henry Crimmel was fined $11.95 in 1901 by the state of Indiana for employing children under the age of 14.

The company used its experience with lighting and lenses to assist the United States government during World War I.  Almost 10 percent of Sneath's production was devoted to a contract with the United States Navy to manufacture signal and masthead lights.  Red, green, and white lights were produced for Navy ships.

By 1918, the company's products (in addition to the lenses and lamps) were lantern globes, colored and crystal specialties, and food preservation ware such as canisters and fruit jars.  Around 1920, the company began making an interesting (but less important) product—a wall-mounted mail box.  These mailboxes were made of glass, enabling one to easily see if mail had been delivered.  Sneath employee William Chapman, working under the supervision of Ray Pruden, was granted a patent for the glass mailbox in 1921.  Ray Pruden was superintendent of the factory, assuming that title after Henry Crimmel's stroke. William Chapman was a well-known glass blower who also secured a patent for an ash tray.  Employees of the company also patented other products, including a drawer pull, a caster for furniture, a newspaper receptacle, and a chick feeding fount.  Years later, the glass mailbox was shown in Popular Mechanics magazine.

Sneath Glass continued making glassware for kitchen cabinet manufacturers such as Hoosier and Sellers, and the 1920s were peak years for that cabinet style. Sneath management also patented more of its products used in kitchen cabinets, such as a sugar bin and a holder for condiment jars. 
  The company also continued to improve its manufacturing process, as two employees were granted a patent for a means to remove glass from molds.

The Great Depression and World War II
In 1930, management consisted of Ralph D. Sneath, president; Alvie Clyde Crimmel, vice president; Henry Hays Crimmel, treasurer and general manager; Harry C. Hill, secretary and sales manager; and Ray Pruden, factory manager.  During the Great Depression of the 1930s, Sneath kept much of its workforce employed by shortening shifts.  This kept the company from losing its skilled workers, and enabled more people to be employed.  The glass business was thought to have one advantage during difficult economic times:  people purchased glass products rather than metal products.

In addition to their kitchen glassware products, Sneath began to make refrigeration products.  Between 1933 and 1941, management secured at least six patents related to mechanical refrigerators. At one time, Sneath Glass produced almost 90 percent of the glassware used in consumer refrigerators in the United States.  This glassware was produced under the name of the appliance manufacturer, and included the major manufacturers of the time.  Some of the consumer refrigeration products produced were defroster trays, cold water pitchers, and butter dishes. Additional products made by Sneath included sundae dishes, ink wells, fish tanks, and battery jars used by farmers' windmills.

Like the company's transition from lantern globes to glassware for kitchen cabinets, the transition to refrigerator products was important for the company's survival.  By the mid-1930s, the Hoosier style cabinets, many of which contained glassware made by Sneath Glass, had lost their popularity.  New houses typically contained built-in cabinetry.

Although the company had transitioned to refrigerator products as a focal point, it still made other merchandise.  One product was the company's own version of borosilicate glass, which was called "heat proof" glass.  This glass could be moved from a refrigerator to an oven without breaking from the extreme temperature change.  Heat proof glass was used for ovenware and coffee makers—and during World War II, it was used in searchlight products.  Unfortunately, the Sneath version of borosilicate glass, like the Sneath brand, was not promoted.

In 1940, millionaire Ralph Sneath died shortly after receiving severe injuries in an automobile accident,
and the last of the founders, Alvie Clyde Crimmel, became chief executive.  Although Sneath did not spend much time at the glass plant, he was well liked and watched the company finances.  Despite this loss, an aging workforce, and an aging infrastructure, the company continued to have talent both in the manufacturing process and creatively.  Employee James A. Lewis received three patents related to glassmaking during the early 1940s, and master glass blower Bill Claytor was well known in the industry.  Mr. Claytor became renowned in Hartford City because of the hand-blown Christmas gifts he made from a small furnace in the garage of his home.

During World War II, the company made water-tight globes and lenses for search lights.  Additional consumer products included glass irons, skillets, and even kitchen sinks.  The 1946 management team was A. C. Crimmel president; Henry Hays Crimmel, Vice President; H.C. Hill, Secretary and Sales Manager; S.B. Sneath Jr., Treasurer; John Richard Crimmel, Assistant Treasurer and Purchasing Agent; and Ray Pruden, Superintendent.  Refrigeration products continued to be the most important segment of the product portfolio at that time.

The end of Sneath Glass

In the early 1950s, glass manufacturers faced competition from the new plastics industry.  Glass companies needed to change with the times or face extinction, and Sneath Glass did not make enough changes.  Refrigerator parts such as drip plates were being made of plastic instead of glass, and the company declined opportunities in both fibreglass and plastics. By making glassware mostly for other companies, Sneath had lost brand recognition, and it did not promote the Sneath brand or products such as its heat proof glass.  Competitors making ovenware products had gained much better brand recognition.  This meant that the company faced declining demand for its top two categories of products.

During 1952, the nation had a system of price controls that attempted to control post-war inflation.  Workers at the Sneath Glass plant held a strike (the first ever for Sneath Glass), demanding better wages and fringe benefits.  Unfortunately, even if the competitive market would accept higher prices for Sneath glassware, the nation's Price Stabilization Board would not allow Sneath to increase prices—
and the company was already losing money.  The plant was closed, and approximately 125 families lost a source of income.  The remaining company founder, A.C. Crimmel, died within two years.  Ironically, Henry Crimmel helped found a company that lasted 60 years, and his brother Jacob helped found a union that contributed (along with management) to the company's demise.

In 1953, Indiana Glass Company purchased controlling interest of the Sneath works.   The Indiana Glass works was located in an adjacent county, in Dunkirk, Indiana.  This acquisition enabled the company to offer 
Sneath's heat proof glass as one of its many glassware products.  Production at the Hartford City plant was restarted briefly, but eventually halted.  In 1957, the Hartford City plant was sold to Canton Glass Company of Marion, Indiana.

Notes and references
Notes

References

Cited works

External links

Corning Museum of Glass—Sneath papers
Photo of Sneath Glass factory
Sneath brochure

Glassmaking companies of the United States
Defunct glassmaking companies
Blackford County, Indiana
Manufacturing companies based in Indiana
Manufacturing companies established in 1892
Manufacturing companies disestablished in 1952
1892 establishments in Ohio
1952 disestablishments in Indiana
Defunct manufacturing companies based in Indiana